Brooklyn is a 2015 romantic period drama film directed by John Crowley and written by Nick Hornby, based on the 2009 novel of the same name by Colm Tóibín. A co-production between the United Kingdom, Ireland, and Canada, it stars Saoirse Ronan in the lead role, with Emory Cohen, Domhnall Gleeson, Jim Broadbent, and Julie Walters in supporting roles. The plot follows Eilis Lacey, a young Irishwoman who emigrates to Brooklyn in the early 1950s to find employment. After building a life there, she is drawn back to her home town of Enniscorthy and has to choose where she wants to forge her future. Principal photography began in April 2014 with three weeks of filming in Ireland, which were followed by four weeks in Montreal, Quebec; only two days of filming took place in Brooklyn, one of which was spent at the beach in Coney Island.

The film premiered on 26 January 2015 at the Sundance Film Festival, and was later screened as part of the Special Presentations section of the Toronto International Film Festival on 13 September. It opened in the United States on 4 November, in the United Kingdom and Ireland on 6 November, and in Canada on 20 November. Critical response to the film was overwhelmingly positive, with many reviewers praising the screenplay and direction. Ronan's performance was also highlighted by many critics, and she was nominated for numerous awards for Best Actress, including a BAFTA, Critics' Choice Award, Golden Globe, and Screen Actors Guild Award. The film won the BAFTA Award for Best British Film, and was nominated for three Academy Awards: Best Picture, Best Actress (for Ronan), and Best Adapted Screenplay. It was also featured on more than 120 film critics' "Top 10" lists of the best films of 2015, and was ranked 48th on the BBC's 2016 list of the 100 Greatest Films of the 21st Century.

Plot
In 1951, in Enniscorthy, a small town in southeast Ireland, Eilis Lacey lives with her mother and older sister, Rose. Although she is an intelligent young woman, Eilis is unable to find full-time employment, so she works weekends at a shop run by the spiteful Miss Kelly. Eilis often accompanies her friend Nancy to local dances, but she is uninterested in the local young men.

Rose arranges with Father Flood, an Irish priest in Brooklyn, for Eilis to move to New York City, where, it is hoped, there will be more opportunities for her. On the trip over, Eilis suffers from seasickness, but is locked out of the shared toilet by the women in the adjoining cabin. Her bunkmate, Georgina, an experienced traveler returning to the United States after a visit home, comes to her aid and offers advice and support.

In New York, Eilis moves into a Brooklyn boarding house run by Mrs Kehoe that caters to young Irish women, and Father Flood gets her a job as a salesclerk at a fancy department store, but she has difficulty adjusting to her new life. She feels homesick, particularly after reading the letters she receives from Rose. Upon learning this, Father Flood takes a more active interest in Eilis and gets her enrolled in night school bookkeeping classes at Brooklyn College, as she wants to become an accountant.

At an Irish dance, Eilis meets Tony Fiorello, an amiable Italian-American plumber. They begin dating, and, as their romance becomes more serious and she progresses in her studies, she gradually begins to feel more at home in Brooklyn.

When Rose unexpectedly dies, Eilis tells Tony she must return home to help her mother. He shows her a plot of land on Long Island and tells her he and his brothers intend to build five houses on it, selling three and keeping one for their parents and one for him and Eilis, if she wants it. She says she does, but she still feels the need to visit her mother, so Tony asks her to marry him before she goes. Eilis is hesitant, but agrees, and they secretly marry at City Hall. While there, they bump into an Irish couple with relatives in Enniscorthy.

Once back in Ireland, Eilis falls, not back into her old life, but into a new one. She temporarily takes Rose's bookkeeping job which shows a promise of turning permanent. Meanwhile Nancy, unaware of Ellis' marriage, sets her up with the thoughtful, well-off bachelor Jim Farrell. Eilis extends her trip to attend Nancy's wedding, and avoids reading Tony's letters. Jim asks her to stay and indicates he would like to propose marriage, but Eilis remains noncommittal, as she is not sure which future she wants for herself, and seemingly distances herself from the life she left behind.

One day, Miss Kelly sends for Eilis, who issues as a veiled threat: that she knows through gossip from the couple at City Hall that Eilis is married. When Miss Kelly begins to mock her, Eilis remembers the stifling and restrictive nature of life in Enniscorthy, and having had enough of the old woman's bullying she states her full married name, establishing that she remembers who she is. This effectively renders Miss Kelly powerless over her. Returning home, Eilis tearfully informs her mother that she is married to Tony and states her plan to return to Brooklyn, leaving a farewell letter for Jim. On the ocean crossing, Eilis offers guidance to a young woman making her own first trip to America. Once home in Brooklyn, Eilis reunites with Tony and they embrace.

Cast

Colm Tóibín, the author of the novel upon which the film is based, has a cameo as the man in line in front of Eilis the first time she goes through immigration in New York.

Production

Historical context
The film is set during a time when Irish migration to New York was thriving. The initial boom of Irish immigration to the US had started during the period following the Great Famine (1845–49). By the end of World War II, the rate of Irish immigration to New York had declined, but newly arriving citizens were still be able to find bustling Irish communities in which women were arguably a more significant presence than men. These women immigrants were often very active in the workplace, placing marriage ambitions on hold to find practical occupations in places such as supermarkets, eateries, and stores. Eilis makes her journey from Ireland to America in the 1950s, along with approximately 50,000 other immigrants (around a quarter of whom moved to New York) as a part of the second minor wave of migration. Many of these migrants were in search of steadier jobs and a happier lifestyle. There were also smaller surges of immigrants from many other countries at this time, expanding the trend of modern-day America becoming a vast land of many different cultures.

Adaptation
Brooklyn is adapted from Irish writer Colm Tóibín's 2009 novel of the same name. The novel has been much-celebrated in the literary world, with The Observer naming it as one of "The 10 best historical novels" in 2012. In addition to this, it won the 2009 Costa Novel Award, was shortlisted for the 2011 International Dublin Literary Award, and was longlisted for the 2009 Booker Prize.

The film is generally regarded as a faithful adaptation of the novel, with Tóibín noting the overall "authenticity" of the film in an interview with The Washington Post. However, the two works differ notably in how they end: in the novel, Eilis leaves Ireland, but her destination and ultimately her fate is left for the reader to decide, while the film ends with Eilis having a poignant reunion with Tony in Brooklyn. In Tóibín's later novel, Nora Webster, set in the 1960s, the author offers a glimpse of Eilis's later life during a conversation between that story's main character, and Eilis's mother.  Both the book and film have been praised for their refreshing perspective on the plight of the Irish immigrant.

Principal photography
Principal photography began on 1 April 2014 in Ireland. The three weeks of filming in the country took place at locations in Enniscorthy, Wexford, and Dublin. On the first day of shooting, Ronan was spotted in period costume on the set in Enniscorthy. Production then moved to Montreal, Quebec, for four more weeks of filming. Two days were spent shooting in Brooklyn, one day of which was spent at the beach in Coney Island.

Music

Release
Brooklyn premiered at the Sundance Film Festival on 26 January 2015, after which a bidding war began between Fox Searchlight Pictures, Focus Features, and The Weinstein Company. Fox Searchlight prevailed, acquiring the distribution rights for the U.S. and several other territories for $9 million, which was one of the biggest deals to ever come out of Sundance. Brooklyn was selected to be shown as part of the Special Presentations section of the 2015 Toronto International Film Festival, where it was screened on 13 September.

In the United States, the film opened in limited release on 4 November 2015, before opening wide on 25 November. It was released by Lionsgate in the United Kingdom and Ireland on 6 November. In Canada, it was given a limited release by Mongrel Media in Toronto and Vancouver on 20 November, before opening nationwide on 11 December.

Reception

Critical response

The film received a standing ovation following its premiere at the 2015 Sundance Film Festival. On the review aggregator website Rotten Tomatoes, it holds an approval rating of 97% based on 277 reviews, with an average score of 8.50/10; the site's "critics consensus" reads: "Brooklyn buttresses outstanding performances from Saoirse Ronan and Emory Cohen with a rich period drama that tugs at the heartstrings as deftly as it satisfies the mind." On Metacritic, the film has a weighted average score of 88 out of 100 based on reviews from 45 critics, indicating "universal acclaim." Audiences polled by PostTrak gave the film an overall positive score of 92%, and over 80% of respondents said they would "definitely recommend" it.

The British Film Institute called the film one of the best releases of 2015. In his review for the organization, Philip Kemp, describing ambiance and tone of the film, stated: "In some ways Brooklyn feels like a movie that's not just about, but also from, a more innocent age." He also pointed out that, while most immigrant stories are "male-led", Brooklyn is "female-led and all the stronger for it", concluding that "In this, as in most other ways, it's faithful to its source material."

A review in Empire expanded on the film's genre and ambiance, stating: "Unashamedly romantic and achieved with a beautifully subtle, old-fashioned elegance, it's a graceful coming-of-age tale ripe for awards."

Box office
Brooklyn grossed $38.3 million in North America and $23.7 million in other territories, for a worldwide total of $62.1 million, against a budget of $11 million. The Hollywood Reporter calculated that the film made a net profit of $3–4 million.

The film's gross in Canada exceeded C$4 million, giving it the highest cumulative domestic gross of any Canadian film released in 2015. In Ireland, it earned over $650,000 from 87 cinemas its opening weekend, which was the biggest opening of any Irish drama in Ireland since Michael Collins opened to $662,000 in November 1996.

Accolades

The film won the Audience Favorite Gold Award in World Cinema at the Mill Valley Film Festival, the Rogers People's Choice Award at the Vancouver International Film Festival, and the Audience Award for Best Narrative Feature at the Virginia Film Festival. Emory Cohen was named Breakthrough Performer at the Hamptons International Film Festival.

Brooklyn received many nominations for industry and critics awards, including three nominations at the 88th Academy Awards: Best Picture, Best Adapted Screenplay, and Best Actress. Saoirse Ronan's performance was particularly praised, and, in addition to her Oscar nod, she garnered BAFTA, Critics' Choice, Golden Globe, and SAG nominations for Best Actress. She also won the BIFA Award for Best Performance by an Actress in a British Independent Film. Julie Walters was nominated for Best Supporting Actress at the BAFTAs. The film won the Canadian Screen Awards for Best Cinematography and Best Musical Score and the Quebec Cinema Awards (formerly known as the Prix Jutra) for Best Cinematography and Best Art Direction.

The film was also featured on more than 120 film critics' "Top 10" lists of the best films of 2015, and was ranked 48th on the BBC's 2016 list of the 100 Greatest Films of the 21st Century. It is ranked as the fourth-best reviewed film of 2015 on Rotten Tomatoes, and as fifth-best on Metacritic.

References

External links

 
 
 
 
 Brooklyn at Library and Archives Canada

2015 films
2015 independent films
2015 romantic drama films
2010s English-language films
BBC Film films
TSG Entertainment films
British Film Institute films
Irish Film Board films
British romantic drama films
Canadian romantic drama films
Irish romantic drama films
English-language Irish films
English-language Canadian films
Films scored by Michael Brook
Films about immigration to the United States
Films about Irish-American culture
Films based on Irish novels
Films directed by John Crowley
Films set in 1951
Films set in 1952
Films set in the 1950s
Films set in Brooklyn
Films set in Ireland
Films shot in the Republic of Ireland
Films shot in Montreal
Films shot in New York City
British historical romance films
2010s historical romance films
Films with screenplays by Nick Hornby
BAFTA winners (films)
Best British Film BAFTA Award winners
2010s Canadian films
2010s British films